Capital punishment was abolished by constitution in the Ivory Coast in 2000. However, there were reports in August 2011 of 26 extrajudicial executions. The Ivory Coast is not a state party to the Second Optional Protocol to the International Covenant on Civil and Political Rights.

References 

Ivory Coast
Law of Ivory Coast